Dularmau, also written as Dular Mau, is a village in Gosainganj block of Lucknow district, Uttar Pradesh, India. As of 2011, its population is 997, in 200 households. It is the seat of a gram panchayat, which also includes the village of Dhakawa.

References 

Villages in Lucknow district